Briddleford Copses is a  Site of Special Scientific Interest (SSSI) and Special Area of Conservation (SAC) which is south of Wootton Bridge on the Isle of Wight in Britain. The site was designated an SAC in 1995 in recognition of the internationally important breeding population of Bechstein's bat that are resident there. The majority of the copses form part of the Briddlesford Nature Reserve, owned and managed by the People's Trust for Endangered Species (PTES), a charitable organisation.

References

Natural England citation sheet

Sites of Special Scientific Interest on the Isle of Wight